Petrovka is a rural locality (a village) in Kalininsky Selsoviet, Bizhbulyaksky District, Bashkortostan, Russia. The population was 92 as of 2010.

References 

Rural localities in Bizhbulyaksky District